Bhimgithe is a former village development committee in Baglung District in the Dhaulagiri Zone of central Nepal which now shares the wards 6 and 7 of Badigad Rural Municipality. At the time of the 1991 Nepal census it had a population of 4,459 and had 781 houses in the village.

References

Populated places in Baglung District